The Multinational Logistics Services (MLS) scandal is being compared to that of the Fat Leonard scandal.  Both involve a husbanding agent that has charged exorbitant fees to the United States Navy in exchange for port services for ships, with the Fat Leonard scandal centered around the United States Seventh Fleet and MLS around the United States Fifth Fleet.

The CEO of MLS, Frank Rafaraci, is accused of defrauding the Navy out of "least $50 million by inflating invoices for ship services between 2011 and 2018"..

Case

"According to the affidavit in support of a criminal complaint filed in September, Frank S. Rafaraci, 68, a U.S. citizen who resides abroad, has been the CEO of MLS since at least 2005. MLS is a defense contractor that provides ship husbanding services, such as refueling and stocking provisions, to U.S. Navy ships at ports worldwide. From approximately 2010 to the present, the U.S. Navy, other U.S. Department of Defense (DoD) components, and U.S. government civilian agencies awarded husbanding services contracts to MLS worth approximately $1.3 billion. The affidavit further alleges that, beginning in 2011, Rafaraci was involved in a wide-ranging scheme to bribe U.S. Navy officials, defraud the U.S. Navy using falsely inflated invoices, and launder the proceeds of the scheme through shell companies Rafaraci had set up in the United Arab Emirates, all in an effort to benefit MLS. Rafaraci made his initial appearance earlier today before U.S. Magistrate Judge G. Michael Harvey of the U.S. District Court for the District of Columbia.".

Investigation
Defense Criminal Investigative Service (DCIS), Navy Criminal Investigative Service (NCIS), Internal Revenue Service Criminal Investigation (IRS-CI), and Army Criminal Investigative Division are investigating the case. Valuable assistance was provided by the Federal Bureau of Investigation (FBI), U.S. Department of State's Diplomatic Security Service, the Malta Police Force, Malta Office of the Attorney General, Essex Police, and U.K. International Crime Coordination Centre.

Court records show that DCIS agent Cordell "Trey" DeLaPena is a lead investigator in both the Fat Leonard and MLS cases.

References

4.  Case 1:21-cr-00610-DLF Document 35-1 Filed 03/23/22 Page 1 of 1

UNITED STATES OF AMERICA
v. :
FRANK RAFARACI : Defendant. :
IT IS SO ORDERED.
UNITED STATES DISTRICT COURT FOR THE DISTRICT OF COLUMBIA

CRIMINAL NO. 1:21-cr-00610-DLF
ORDER
For the reasons stated in the Joint Motion to Strike, the motion is hereby GRANTED. It is
ORDERED that the Clerk shall strike Doc. No. 1 and remove it from the public docket. It is further ORDERED that the Clerk shall maintain a copy of Doc No. 1 in its files. It is further ORDERED that the charges in the Complaint related to conspiracy to commit bribery, conspiracy to commit wire fraud, and conspiracy to commit money laundering are dismissed without prejudice.
 /s/ Dabney L. Friedrich
DABNEY L. FRIEDRICH, JUDGE UNITED STATES DISTRICT COURT

Further reading

External Links
Multinational Logistics Services Corporation Homepage

Political corruption investigations in the United States
United States military scandals
United States Navy in the 21st century